Heroin-assisted treatment (HAT), or diamorphine assisted treatment, refers to a type of Medication-Assisted Treatment (MAT) where semi-synthetic heroin is prescribed to opiate addicts who do not benefit from, or cannot tolerate, treatment with one of the established drugs used in opiate replacement therapy such as methadone or buprenorphine (brand name Subutex). For this group of patients, heroin-assisted treatment has proven superior in improving their social and health situation. It has also been shown to save money, as it significantly reduces costs incurred by trials, incarceration, health interventions and delinquency. It has also drastically reduced overdose deaths in the countries utilizing it, as patients take their dose in a controlled, professionally supervised setting, and Narcan (naloxone) is on hand in the case of an accidental overdose. Opiate related overdoses in the U.S. kill around 70,000 people per year.

Heroin-assisted treatment is fully a part of the national health system in Switzerland, Germany, the Netherlands, Canada, and Denmark. Additional trials are being carried out in the United Kingdom, Norway, and Belgium.

History 
The British have had a system of heroin maintenance since the 1920s. For decades it supplied a few hundred addicts nationwide, most of whom were doctors themselves. It was de-emphasized considerably during the 1960s-1980s as a result of the U.S. led war on drugs. In the 1980s and early 1990s, Dr John Marks ran heroin-prescribing clinics in Liverpool, Widnes and Warrington that were highly controversial. Because of the lack of large-scale trials, only anecdotal evidence existed as to the efficacy of the treatment. This changed in 1994 when Switzerland, faced with one of the largest open drug scenes in Europe at the time, started large-scale trials on the potential use of diamorphine as a maintenance drug. They proved diamorphine to be a viable maintenance drug which has shown equal or better rates of success than methadone in terms of assisting long-term users establish stable, crime-free lives. These results encouraged countries like Germany and the Netherlands to conduct their own trials and finally to include heroin-assisted treatment fully as a part of the national health system in 2009. In recent years the British have begun moving towards the inclusion of heroin maintenance programs as a legitimate component of their National Health Service. In 2013 European Union's European Monitoring Centre for Drugs and Drug Addiction issued guidelines for the years 2013–2020; for the first time since the EMCDDA's 1995 inception, the group advocated "reducing the health and social risks and harms caused by drugs" in addition to longstanding policies of lessening demand and supply. Both the United Nations Office on Drugs and Crime and the Transnational Institute have released documents advocating harm-reduction strategies, though only the latter mentions heroin-assisted therapy.

In 2008, the right-wing Swiss People's Party initiated a national referendum on heroin-assisted treatment. A significant majority (approximately 68%) voted in favor of continuing Swiss HAT programs.

In the Netherlands, both injectable Diamorphine HCl as injectable salt in dry ampoules as well as Heroin base with 5-10% caffeine for vaporization are available, both are to be taken twice daily in a supervised setting and will be accompanied with a daily take home dosage of methadone for the evening.

In Switzerland patients may be allowed to appear only once a day and receive part of their diamorphine in pill form for oral consumption. This is possible only after a six-month period and is usually granted only if necessary to hold down a job.

Criticism 

Critics, such as the Drug Free America Foundation, have criticized heroin-assisted treatment along with other harm reduction strategies for allegedly creating the perception that certain behaviors can be partaken safely, such as illicit drug use, claiming that this may lead to an increase in that behavior by people who would otherwise be deterred.

Such shortcomings arguably exist with some harm reduction measures, such as supervised injection facilities. These facilities provide users with the information and equipment necessary to avoid infection with diseases such as HIV, but leave them dependent on the black market. So users still face the health risk associated with the injection of impure street drugs and they still face the enormous financial strain of financing their addiction.

In the case of heroin-assisted treatment however, users are provided with a form of pharmaceutical-grade heroin injection solution which doctors consider fit for injection. And as doctors refrain from drastic changes in dose and provide post-injection monitoring, overdoses are rare and can be quickly treated with opioid antagonists like naloxone. Thus, patients in heroin-assisted treatment are relieved from the major complex of problems that defines illicit heroin use. Synthetic heroin taken under the aforementioned conditions is not neurotoxic and has few long-term side effects beside constipation and dependency. And while it had been speculated that the availability of such treatment options might change public perception of the risks associated with drug use and might lead to an increase in illicit drug use, the incidence of heroin abuse in Switzerland has declined sharply since the introduction of heroin-assisted treatment. As a study published in The Lancet concluded:

Also, the notion that patients in such treatment programs are enabled to maintain "destructive behavior" contradicts the findings that patients significantly recover in terms of both their social and health situation. A clinical follow-up report on the German study on this matter found that 40% of all patients and 68% of those able to work had found employment after four years of treatment. Some even started a family after years of homelessness and delinquency.

See also
Opioid agonist therapy
Drug policy of Switzerland
Drug policy of the Netherlands

References 

Drug policy
Drug rehabilitation
Heroin
Alternative medical treatments